François Gérard Marie Lecointre (born 6 February 1962) is a French army general who served as Chief of the Defence Staff between 2017 and 2021. As a captain, with Lieutenant Bruno Heluin (platoon leader) as the company commanding officer, he led an assault at the Battle of Vrbanja Bridge in 1995 that was the last fixed bayonet charge of the French Armed Forces.

Biography 

François Lecointre was born on 6 February 1962 in Cherbourg into a military family. His father, Yves Urbain Marie Lecointre (5 April 1932 – 1985), was a French naval officer and submariner who served as the commandant of SNLE Le Redoutable. One of his uncles, Hélie de Roffignac, was a cavalry officer who died in Algeria at the age of 23.

Military career 

Lecointre attended preparatory classes at the Prytanée National Militaire in La Flèche. He subsequently studied at the École spéciale militaire de Saint-Cyr (Promotion Général Monclar) from 1984 to 1987 and then at the Infantry School from 1987 to 1988.

Lecointre joined the 3rd Marine Infantry Regiment, where he served from 1988 to 1991. Lecointre was promoted from lieutenant to captain in the marine infantry on 1 July 1991.

From 1993 to 1996, he was a combat company commander of the 3rd Marine Infantry Regiment in Vannes. As a captain, Lecointre was involved in the Opération Turquoise in 1994 in Rwanda. He commanded the 1st company of the 3rd Marine Infantry Regiment (3e RIMa) in the Groupement Nord Turquoise. Lecointre was also engaged with French forces under the command of the United Nations Protection Force (UNPROFOR) during the Bosnian War. Under the orders of General Hervé Gobilliard and Colonel Erik Sandahl, Lecointre and  Lieutenant Bruno Heluin led a bayonet charge to win the Battle of Vrbanja Bridge on 27 May 1995. According to journalist Jean Guisnel, the episode turned the tide of the war and led to victory in Bosnia.

From 1996 to 1999, Lecointre was an instructor at the École spéciale militaire de Saint-Cyr in Coëtquidan, Morbihan where he trained student officers in military tactics. From 1999 to 2001, he was a trainee officer at the Joint Defense College (now École Militaire). He then served in the office of the Chief of Staff of the French Army in Paris at the crops bureau of system conception forces.

From 2005 to 2007, Colonel Lecointre was the commanding officer of the 3rd Marine Infantry Regiment in Vannes.

From 2007 to 2008, he studied at the Center of High Military Studies (CHEM) and was an auditor at the Institut des hautes études de défense nationale (IHEDN) in Paris.

He was promoted to brigade general on 1 August 2011, and was in command of the 9th Marine Infantry Brigade in Poitiers until 2013. Lecointre was later appointed as commander of the European Union Training Mission in Mali from January to July 2013.

He rejoined the general staff headquarters of the French Army as a chargé de mission, becoming deputy-chief of the defence staff for « performance-synthèse » from 2014 to 2016. Lecointre was promoted to division general on 1 January 2015.

Head of the Prime Minister's military cabinet since August 2016, Lecointre was elevated by a decree of President François Hollande from the first section of general officers to the rank of corps general on 1 March 2017.

On 20 July 2017, Lecointre was appointed Chief of the Defence Staff by President Emmanuel Macron, following the resignation of General Pierre de Villiers. He took office the day after his appointment and was promoted to the rank of Général d'armée.

General Lecointre made his first official visit to the United States in February 2018. He met with his American counterpart Joseph Dunford to discuss the ongoing War against the Islamic State and progress on the G5 Sahel.

Military ranks

Honours and decorations

Publications 
 François Lecointre (dir.), Le soldat : XXe – XXIe siècle, Gallimard, coll. « Folio Histoire », 2018. With a foreword by French historian Jean-Pierre Rioux. This book is a collection of articles published in the French review of military studies : Inflexions - Civils et militaires : pouvoir dire, of which general Lecointre was a publishing director in 2015–2017.

See also 
Hervé Charpentier
Pierre de Villiers
Battle of Vrbanja Bridge

References

Notes

External links 

Living people
1962 births
People from Cherbourg-Octeville
École Spéciale Militaire de Saint-Cyr alumni
French generals
Grand Officiers of the Légion d'honneur
Commanders of the Ordre national du Mérite
Recipients of the Cross for Military Valour
Recipients of the Croix de guerre des théâtres d'opérations extérieures
Commanders of the National Order of Mali
Commanders of the Legion of Merit
Grand Officers of the Order of Merit of the Italian Republic
Chief of the Defence Staff (France)
Recipients of orders, decorations, and medals of Senegal